The 2006 Turkmenistan Higher League (Ýokary Liga) season was the fourteenth season of Turkmenistan's professional football league. Eight teams competed in 2006.

Final table

External links
 

Ýokary Liga seasons
Turk
Turk
1